Diglycidyl resorcinol ether, also called Resorcinol diglycidyl ether (RDGE)  is a liquid aromatic organic chemical compound and chemically a glycidyl ether. It has the formula C12H14O4 and the CAS Registry Number 101-90-6. It is one of a number of glycidyl ethers available commercially that are used to reduce the viscosity of epoxy resins. These are then further used in coatings, sealants, adhesives and elastomers. It has the CAS Registry Number 101-90-6. It has the IUPAC name 2-[[3-(oxiran-2-ylmethoxy)phenoxy]methyl]oxirane and is registered on TSCA (Toxic Substances Control Act of 1976) as  Oxirane, 2,2'-[1,3-phenylenebis(oxymethylene)]bis-. It is REACH registered and on EINECS.

Synonyms

 1,3-Bis(2,3-epoxypropoxy)benzene
 1,3-Diglycidyloxybenzene
 2,2'-(1,3-Phenylenebis(oxymethylene))bisoxirane
 Araldite ERE 1359
 Diglycidyl ether of resorcinol
 m-Bis(2,3-epoxypropoxy)benzene
 meta-Bis(glycidyloxy)benzene
 Oxirane, 2,2'-(1,3-phenylenebis(oxymethylene))bis-
 RDGE
 Resorcinol bis(2,3-epoxypropyl)ether
 Resorcinol diglycidyl ether

Synthesis
Resorcinol and epichlorohydrin are reacted in the presence of a base and not a Lewis acid catalyst as normal with glycidyl ethers. A halohydrin is formed. This is followed by washing with sodium hydroxide in dehydrochlorination step. This forms Resorcinol diglycidyl ether. The waste products are water and sodium chloride and excess caustic soda. One of the quality control tests would involve measuring the Epoxy value by determination of the epoxy equivalent weight.

Uses

The material has two oxirane groups and is thus used mainly in epoxy resins systems as a reactive diluent and modifier. It has found use as an additive for bonding resin systems and also as a modifier for phenolic resins Despite the toxicity it generally gives excellent properties and so there are military applications. The use of the diluent does effect mechanical properties and microstructure of epoxy resins.

Toxicology

It is classed as IARC group 2B by the International Agency for Research on Cancer. The toxicology has been studied for a long time and is fairly well understood.

See also
 Epoxide
 Glycidol

References

Further reading

External Websites
  Parchem RDGE
  Technical Data Sheet
  Safety Data Sheet

Reactive diluents
Glycidyl ethers